The Hebei tractor rampage was an apparently spontaneous mass murder rampage in August 2010 in which 17 people were killed in Yuanshi County, Hebei, China by an intoxicated man driving a bucket loader. At least 20 others were wounded in the attack.

The rampage
The rampage began when coal worker Li Xianliang, who had been drinking and had a blood alcohol content of 154 milligrams per 100 millilitres, had an argument. Early reports said his first intended victim was a customer, whom he tried to kill. The customer escaped, but another nearby was killed as the rampage began. A later report said that the first person killed was the murderer's boss, with whom he had been arguing about money.

During the incident, the attacker smashed into cars, motorcycles, buses, shops and trees. A passersby jumped onto the tractor, and one stabbed the driver in an attempt to stop the attack. The killer tried to attack the passersby with a crowbar and a brick before being subdued. At least eight of the victims died at the scene of the attack, while at least another three died in a hospital. The youngest victim was five years old. The rampage lasted for about an hour.

Aftermath
The attack followed unrelated attacks on schools elsewhere in China; the Chinese government removed some mentions of the incidents from the internet in China for fear that mass coverage of such violence can provoke copycat attacks. The various attacks on anonymous people and an attack on police have resulted in calls for better mental health care, as mental health problems often go undiagnosed and untreated in China. As a result, 550 new mental health clinics were opened and security was increased outside primary schools and nurseries all over China.

See also
List of countries by intentional homicide rate
Mental health in China
Marvin Heemeyer

References

External links
What makes a Mass Killer?
Mass Murder: A Small Person's Way to Immortality
Death toll rises in China tractor rampage, The Associated Press (August 3, 2010)
河北疯狂铲车致8死20余伤 系男子杀人后冲进公路, news.china.com (August 2, 2010)
元氏铲车冲撞致11人死 司机李献良原系酒驾, haixiachina.com (August 4, 2010)
河北驾铲车撞人男子被拘 同事称其是老实人, Sohu (August 4, 2010)

Attacks in China in 2010
August 2010 crimes
Mass murder in 2010
History of Hebei
Murders by motor vehicle
Vehicular rampage in China
Shijiazhuang
China
21st-century mass murder in China